The Worshipful Company of Salters is one of the Livery Companies of the City of London, 9th in order of precedence.  The Company originated as the Guild of Corpus Christi, which was granted a Royal Charter of incorporation in 1394. Further Charters granted the Company the authority to set standards and regulations regarding the products of its members.

Originally, the Salters' Company included individuals whose trades involved the usage of salts and the preparation of chemical mixtures for use in food. As with many other livery companies, the Salters' Company has lost its direct connection to its original trade. Currently, however, the company supports the chemical industry and supports education in chemistry, for example by awarding scholarships to chemistry students. Furthermore, it is a charitable organization.

The Company's motto is Sal Sapit Omnia, Latin for Salt Savours All.

Salters' Hall
Salters' Hall, St. Swithin's Lane, was home of the company until it was bombed in 1941. The hall was during the 1700s the meeting place of Presbyterians and in 1719 the site of the "Salters' Hall controversy" a notable turning point in religious tolerance in England.  The present Salters' Hall on Fore Street dates from 1976 and was designed by architect Basil Spence, best known for his work on Coventry Cathedral.

Salters' Institute
This is the educational charity of the Company, originally set up in 1918 as the Salters' Institute of Industrial Chemistry to support chemistry students after the First World War, particularly those whose studies had been interrupted by military service.  It now provides prizes for students of chemistry, chemical engineering, biology and physics, (plus science technicians) as well as running various activities to promote the study of science, particularly chemistry.

Coat of arms

The arms were granted by Thomas Benolt in 1530. The crest and supporters followed in 1591, granted by Robert Cooke. Blazon: Per chevron azure and gules, three covered salts argent, garnished or. Crest: On a wreath of the colours, a cubit arm erect, issuing from clouds all proper, holding a covered salt argent, garnished or. Supporters: Two otters sable, bezanty, ducally gorged and chained or.

See also
Drysalter

References

External links
 The Salters' Company

Salters
1559 establishments in England